Latifa Ibn Ziaten (Arabic: لطيفة بن زياتين born 1 January 1960 in Tétouan, Morocco), is a French-Moroccan activist. She is the mother of Imad ibn Ziaten, born in 1981, the first service member in Toulouse killed by Mohammed Merah on 11 March 2012.

Life 

She is a practicing Muslim, and arrived in France in 1977 at the age of 17, to join her husband Ahmed who worked for the SNCF. She is the mother of five children, four boys and one girl. One son was Imad Ibn Ziaten, sergeant of the 1st paratroop Regiment who was traveling from Francazal near Toulouse, when the terrorist Mohamed Merah murdered him on March 11, 2012.

She then worked as a supervisor and receptionist at the Museum of Fine Arts of Rouen.

After the death of her son, she went to Izards, the underprivileged neighbourhood in the northeast of Toulouse where the murderer lived. where she asked a group of teenagers if they knew Merah. She told the media that they responded: “Don’t you watch TV, Madame? He’s a hero, a martyr for Islam!”  

Following this meeting, she decided to create the Imad ibn Ziaten youth association for peace and in April 2012, in order to help young people in deprived areas, and to promote secularism and interreligious dialogue. The association is sponsored by actor Jamel Debbouze, and an office is at the town hall of the 4th district of Paris by Christophe Girard.

In February 2014, attended by the Interior Minister, Manuel Valls, the Representative Council of Jewish Institutions in France (CRIF) Midi-Pyrénées honored its association by giving her an award to honor her work. She also received support from the Ministry of Education which awards an annual grant.

In January 2015, she was invited to the Synagogue de la Victoire in Paris, attended by President of the Republic, François Hollande, to light a candle in honor of the seventeen victims of the attack against Charlie Hebdo and the taking hostages in the kosher Hyper store near Vincennes.

On November 19, 2015, with President Hollande, Latifa Ibn Ziaten received the Prize for Prevention Conflict by the Fondation Chirac, for her continued promotion of inter-religious dialogue and a culture of peace.

In 2016, she received an International Women of Courage Award.

Works 
 Mort pour la France : Mohamed Merah a tué mon fils, Paris, Flammarion, 2013, 268

Awards 
 Chevalier de la Légion d'honneur (from 14 July 2015)
 Lauréate 2015 du Prix pour la prévention des conflits de la fondation Chirac
 International Women of Courage Award.

See also 
 Tueries de mars 2012 à Toulouse et Montauban

References 

Chevaliers of the Légion d'honneur
People from Rouen
1960 births
Living people
Recipients of the International Women of Courage Award
Moroccan emigrants to France